Peter Sahlins (born April 26, 1957) is an American historian of France and Europe. He was a professor of history at the University of California Berkeley, where he specialized in early modern France. From 2006 to 2008 he was on leave at the Social Science Research Council as its Director of Academic Programs, where he directed the major fellowship programs and led a new environmental programming initiative.

Biography 

Professor Sahlins completed his undergraduate degree at Harvard University in 1979. In 1986, he obtained his doctorate in history from Princeton University. Afterwards he taught at Columbia University and Yale University before joining the history department at the University of California, Berkeley in 1989, where he has served widely on university and professional committees,  was executive director of the France-Berkeley Fund (1994-2002) and founding director of the University of California's Paris Study Center and its constituent international programs.  He is a former Director of the Interdisciplinary Studies Field major at Berkeley.

His father was Marshall Sahlins, a noted anthropologist.

Work 

The interests that form the bulk of Peter Sahlins’ work include the social and legal history of early modern France and Europe.  He has written on a range of topics, including the formation of national identities and frontiers (Boundaries: the Making of France and Spain in the Pyrenees, UC Press, 1989 ); forest governance, peasant culture and protest in the nineteenth century (The War of the Demoiselles in Nineteenth-Century France, Harvard University Press, 1994 ); state-building and immigration in seventeenth-century France (with Jean-Francois Dubost, Et si on faisait payer les etrangers? Louis XIV, les immigres, et quelques autres, Flammarion, 1999 ); the premodern history of nationality law (Unnaturally French: Foreign Citizens in the Old Regime and After, Cornell University Press, 2004 ); and most recently on animals, 1668: The Year of the Animal in France (New York: Zone Books, 2017 ).

References

External links 
 Peter Sahlins Biography at the University of California Berkeley
 University of California’s Paris Study Center

21st-century American historians
21st-century American male writers
1957 births
Living people
Harvard University alumni
Princeton University alumni
Columbia University faculty
Yale University faculty
University of California, Berkeley faculty
Historians from California
American male non-fiction writers